There are over 9,000 Grade I listed buildings in England.  This page is a list of these buildings in the county of Merseyside.

Knowsley

|}

Liverpool

|}

Sefton

|}

St. Helens

|}

Wirral

|}

See also
 Grade II* listed buildings in Merseyside

Notes

References 
National Heritage List for England

External links

 
Lists of listed buildings in Merseyside
Merseyside